Harmons Grocery Company, doing business as Harmons Neighborhood Grocer, is an upscale supermarket chain located within the state of Utah, United States, with 20 stores throughout the Wasatch Front and in the St. George area.

Description

In addition to selling groceries and some non-food items, Harmons also have pharmacies, post offices, full-time chefs, and some also have coffee bars, on-site dietitians, and cooking schools. The grocery store chain emphasizes sourcing from local companies and farms, and focuses on making many of their store brand products with higher-quality ingredients. In addition, many of their deli, bakery, and meat department products are made from scratch.

History
In 1932, George Reese (Jake) Harmon and his wife Irene started a small grocery store called "The Market Spot" which initially sold fruit and vegetables.  The couple lived in a small living quarters behind the store which was located at 3300 South and Main Street in Salt Lake County (modern day South Salt Lake). Soon, the store was selling many other grocery items.  In 1942, after a vehicle collided with the store and caused serious structural damage, the Harmons went on to open a cafe. By 1945, the cafe was sold and a new grocery store, initially called "The Green Store", was opened at 4000 West and 3500 South.  This site eventually became the first "Harmons Market" and is still a Harmons site today, although with a new structure (the original Harmons Market burned in 1971). A new replacement store became the first "Harmons Supermarket". By 1976, there were two Harmons, and by 1998, there were eight.

Since then, Harmons has more than doubled the number of locations. Despite the closing of a store in Ogden in 2015 (which they sold to Ridley's Family Markets, which is, as of 2021, now an empty building), Harmons has expanded somewhat aggressively throughout Utah. They expanded their urban presence with the opening of a new location on the east end of the City Creek Center development in the heart of downtown Salt Lake City in March 2012. They continued with another expansion phase in 2016, opening two locations in Santa Clara in southern Utah, and Lehi on the Wasatch Front. They opened their 18th store in Holladay - their 3rd "urban" location, in mid February 2018, while a 19th location opened in Riverton in mid-2018 as part of a major new mixed-use development.

In 2009, Harmons won the Utah Green Business Award from Utah Business Magazine.

In 2017, Harmons launched an online shopping platform for curbside pickup or delivery.

In 2021, Harmons began construction of another "urban" location near the North Shore area of the Daybreak development. This location opened on Apr. 27, 2022. It was also announced that the grocer plans to build a store in the Park City area as part of the Tanger Outlet redevelopment.

Locations

Utah
 Draper 
 Draper
 Bangerter Crossing
 Farmington - Station Park
 Holladay - Holladay Market
 Kearns - Cougar
 Lehi - Traverse Mountain
 Midvale - Seventh Street
 Orem
 Park City (Announced)
 Riverton - Mountain View Village
 Roy
 Salt Lake City
 Brickyard
 City Creek
 Emigration Market
 Santa Clara
 South Jordan
 The District
 South Jordan
 Daybreak
 St. George
 Taylorsville
 West Valley City
 Ogden- Five Points (permanently closed)

References

External links
 

Companies based in Salt Lake City
Retail companies established in 1945
Supermarkets of the United States
1945 establishments in Utah